John Washington Thompson, Jr. (born January 18, 1957) is an American former professional football player who was a tight end in the National Football League (NFL). Thompson was drafted by the Green Bay Packers in the ninth round of the 1979 NFL Draft and played four seasons with the team.

References

Players of American football from Jackson, Mississippi
Green Bay Packers players
American football tight ends
Weber State Wildcats football players
Utah State Aggies football players
1957 births
Living people